Kevin Burleson (born April 9, 1979) is an  American professional basketball coach, and a former professional basketball player. He is currently the head coach of Rio Grande Valley Vipers of the NBA G League.

He played college basketball for the University of Minnesota Golden Gophers and began his professional career in the German basketball league. He played for the Charlotte Bobcats of the National Basketball Association (NBA) in 2005–06.

Early life
Burleson was born in Seattle, Washington. He was born to a prolific sporting family: his father, Al Burleson, played defensive back in the Canadian Football League (CFL) and the United States Football League (USFL). His older brother Alvin Jr. played college football for the University of Washington Huskies and the Western Illinois University Leathernecks. His younger brother Nate was a wide receiver in the National Football League (NFL), while younger brother Lyndale played college basketball for the University of Nevada Wolf Pack. Kevin and Nate Burleson are one of only two sets of siblings in which one played in the NBA and one in the NFL. Like his brothers he played several sports early on, but gave up baseball as he found it too slow, and gave up football for fear of an injury that would prevent him from playing basketball.

Burleson graduated from O'Dea High School after transferring from Garfield High School after his freshman year. At O'Dea, Burleson earned three letters in basketball and one in track and field and played basketball under coach Phil Lumpkin. In his junior year, Burleson helped O'Dea go undefeated through a 29-game season and win the state title.

College career
Burleson was offered a basketball scholarship to the University of Washington, but opted instead to attend the University of Minnesota for a chance to play in the Big Ten Conference. He played for the Minnesota Golden Gophers men's basketball team from 1999 to 2003 after redshirting the 1998–99 season. Minnesota made the 2001 National Invitation Tournament (NIT), and Burleson scored a season-high 21 points in Minnesota's win over Villanova in the first round. As a junior, Burleson led Minnesota with 146 assists and had an assist/turnover ratio 146–58.

Professional career
Burleson began his professional career in Germany. He played for the USC Heidelberg in the 2003–2004 season and for the Walter Tigers Tübingen of Basketball Bundesliga in the 2004–2005 season. He was then signed by the Charlotte Bobcats of the NBA on August 31, 2005. He played with the Bobcats for the 2005–2006 season, but was subsequently cut.

In the 2006 NBA Development League draft, the Fort Worth Flyers picked Burleson as the fourth overall pick in the first round. Burleson played for the Flyers for the  season, then signed with the Turkish Basketball League team Mersin Büyükşehir Belediye for the 2007–2008 season. In January 2009 he signed with the Idaho Stampede of the NBA Development League the day after being traded from the Iowa Energy. Burleson finished his career with the Egyptian team Al-Ittihad Alexandria.

References

External links
NBA.com Profile – Kevin Burleson
Minnesota Golden Gophers bio (archived)

1979 births
Living people
African-American basketball players
American expatriate basketball people in Germany
American expatriate basketball people in Romania
American expatriate basketball people in Turkey
American men's basketball players
Basketball coaches from Washington (state)
Basketball players from Seattle
Charlotte Bobcats players
CSU Asesoft Ploiești players
Fort Worth Flyers players
Idaho Stampede players
Iowa Wolves coaches
Memphis Grizzlies assistant coaches
Mersin Büyükşehir Belediyesi S.K. players
Minnesota Golden Gophers men's basketball players
Minnesota Timberwolves assistant coaches
Point guards
Rio Grande Valley Vipers coaches
Tigers Tübingen players
Undrafted National Basketball Association players
USC Heidelberg players
21st-century African-American sportspeople
Al Ittihad Alexandria Club basketball players
20th-century African-American sportspeople